Marcus Mann may refer to:
Marcus Mann (basketball) (born 1973), American basketball player
Marcus Mann (footballer) (born 1984), German footballer

See also
Marc Mann, American musician
Mark Mann (born 1970), American artist